Ebenezer Bible College The Ebenezer Bible Institute was established, by the late Pastor Chacko Mani, in 1969 at Kumily in Idukki District of Kerala. In 1979, it was moved to the  campus having road and rail facilities at Kaduthuruthy beside the Kottayam- Ernakulam highway. Kaduthuruthy-Mannar, Kottayam district, Kerala, India. It is accredited to grant Dip.Th.(Malayalam & English), B.Th. (Eng) and M.Div. (Eng) degrees.

History
Ebenezer Bible College was founded in 1969 at Kumily and is now sited at Kaduthuruthy, Kottayam.

Ebenezer Bible College was founded by Pastor Chacko Mani.

References

External links
 

Universities and colleges in Kottayam
Christian seminaries and theological colleges in India
Bible colleges
Educational institutions established in 1969
1969 establishments in Kerala